Mix-Up is the debut studio album by English band Cabaret Voltaire. It was released on 23 October 1979, through record label Rough Trade.

Content 
The album contains a cover of The Seeds' song "No Escape", from their 1966 eponymous debut album.

Critical reception 

Writing in Smash Hits in 1979, Red Starr said the album was an "intriguing but only occasionally attractive array of verbal and musical images". Starr went on to say that it sounded like "pointless backroom self indulgence". Steven Grant echoed Starr's ambivalence in Trouser Press, saying that the album "has an obsessive strength — like Eno in his stranger moments but without his repetitiveness," but that "The music, though fascinating, is rarely coherent."

In a retrospective review, Head Heritage described Mix-Up as "a great snapshot of a brief period in post-punk UK when there was a sudden urge to grapple with a bizarre, homemade, hamfisted white dub landscape." AllMusic writer Andy Kellman was less favourable, writing that "Cabaret Voltaire's first two proper studio albums hardly match the greatness of later works like Red Mecca, 2 X 45 and even 3 Crepuscule Tracks", while noting that Mix-Up "only helped solidify Cabaret Voltaire's status as an integral part of the extended frisson of 1978–1982 post-punk".

Track listing

Personnel 
 Cabaret Voltaire
 Stephen Mallinder – vocals, bass guitar, percussion
 Chris Watson – synthesizers, tapes
 Richard H. Kirk – guitar, synthesizers, wind instruments
 Haydn Boyes Weston – drums

 Additional personnel
 Porky – mastering

References

External links 
 

1979 debut albums
Cabaret Voltaire (band) albums
Rough Trade Records albums